Sialaiana is an Asian genus of bush crickets in the tribe Agraeciini, belonging to the 'conehead' subfamily Conocephalinae.

Species
The Orthoptera Species File lists:
 Sialaiana sigfridi Gorochov, 2008
 Sialaiana transiens Ingrisch, 1998- type species (locality near Buon Luoi village, Gia Lai Province, Viet Nam)

References

External links 
 
 

Conocephalinae
Tettigoniidae genera
Orthoptera of Asia